The Voodoo Castle (previously known as the Voodoo Museum) is located in the city of Strasbourg in the department of Bas-Rhin, Alsace.

Description 

Founded in January 2014 by Marie-Luce and Marc Arbogast, and managed by a non-profit local organization, this museum presents one of the most important collections of private Voodoo art in France.

It is on display at the old water castle of Strasbourg built in 1878 and listed as a historic monument of France since 1984.

The museum opens its doors from Wednesday to Sunday, from 2 PM to 6 PM. Under reservation, a group visit (with a minimum of 8 people) may be possible outside of the set hours. Young people are also welcome to explore the vast mysteries surrounding Voodoo culture.

Collection 
The collection of Voodoo art pieces originate from Togo, Benin, Ghana, and Nigeria. They are curated by Marc and Marie Luce and near 1060 pieces, of which 220 are displayed at the permanent exhibition entitled "Voodoo as an art to see differently" (in French, « le vodou, l’art de voir autrement »). It is by far the biggest collection of African Voodoo art pieces in the world.

Museum's collector has expressed the following words: "The Voodoo Castle is the manifestation of my passion for Africa, colliding with my curiosity in its traditional knowledge, chemistry, and hunting. […] Like my travels in Africa, I would like for this Museum as well as its collections to awaken supernatural meetings, grabbing always and still the curiosity for the human nature, in the spirit of creativity ; it is there that presides the creation of such surprising art pieces, sometimes off-putting, but always profoundly human.

See also

Bibliography
 Pascal Coquis, « L'esprit Vodou », in Les Saisons d'Alsace, no 64 (Les aventuriers), Summer 2015, p. 18-23
 Pauline Monteiro, « Initiation au vodou », in Cahier Vodou, ed. Association des Amis du Château Vodou, Strasbourg, 2015, 24 p.
 Bernard Müller and Nanette Jacomijn Snoep (dir.), Vodou : autour de la collection Arbogast, Loco, Paris, 2013, 271 p.

Filmography
Sur la piste du vaudou, a documentary film by David Arnold, for Bix Films/France Télévisions, 2012, 52 min

External links
 
 Dossier de presse

References

Museums in Strasbourg
2014 establishments in France